The second season of Prison Break, an American serial drama television series, commenced airing in the United States on August 21, 2006, on Mondays at 8:00 pm (EST) on Fox. Prison Break is produced by Adelstein-Parouse Productions, in association with Rat Entertainment, Original Film and 20th Century Fox Television. The season contains 22 episodes, and concluded on April 2, 2007. Series creator Paul Scheuring describes the second season as "The Fugitive times eight," and likens it to the "second half of The Great Escape."

Prison Break revolves around two brothers: one who has been sentenced to death for a crime he did not commit and his younger sibling, a genius who devises an elaborate plan to help him escape prison. The brothers, along with six other prisoners at Fox River State Penitentiary, manage to escape, and the second season follows a massive manhunt chasing the group. Dubbed the Fox River Eight, the group splits and members go their individual way, occasionally meeting up to help each other. They struggle to escape from the police while avoiding a secret group of multinationals called The Company, that wants them all dead.

For the season, three characters are downgraded from series regular to recurring status, and a new character is introduced. Filming took place in Dallas, Texas, due to a close proximity of rural and urban settings. For the final three episodes, scenes were filmed in Pensacola, Florida, to represent Panama. Critical reviews of the season were generally positive, with the addition of William Fichtner to the cast receiving much praise. Fox Home Entertainment released the season in Region 1 on September 4, 2007.

Cast

Main characters
Dominic Purcell as Lincoln Burrows
Wentworth Miller as Michael Scofield
Robin Tunney as Veronica Donovan
Amaury Nolasco as Fernando Sucre
Marshall Allman as L.J. Burrows
Wade Williams as Captain Brad Bellick
Paul Adelstein as Secret Service Agent Paul Kellerman
Robert Knepper as Theodore "T-Bag" Bagwell
Rockmond Dunbar as Benjamin Miles "C-Note" Franklin
Sarah Wayne Callies as Dr. Sara Tancredi
William Fichtner as FBI Special Agent Alexander Mahone

Recurring characters

Episodes

Production

Filming
Filming began on June 15, 2006, in Dallas, Texas due to a close proximity of rural and urban settings. Executive producer Matt Olmstead stated that the filming location was changed from Chicago in the first season to Dallas in the second season because the characters were on the run. Many locations were needed to represent various American towns, which Dallas provided, whereas locations within Chicago took several hours to travel between.  Olmstead noted, "It really came down to a financial thing." Other locations that were considered for filming were New Mexico, Arizona and Louisiana. Dallas was chosen because of its "resourcefulness, cost effectiveness and variety with regard to activities available for the crew", which was considered to be a major component for the final decision. Filming took place in Dallas for nine to ten months, where 20 of the 22 episodes were shot. The series was expected to bring $50 million into the city of Dallas. For the final three episodes of the second season, filming took place in Pensacola, Florida to represent Panama. Filming for each episode took place over eight days, which contributed approximately $1.4 million to the local economy.

Release

Critical reception
Mike Duffy of the Detroit Free Press commended the premiere for delivering "rocking good entertainment," and living up to the standard set by the first season.  Duffy praised the "motley crew of cellblock characters" and the "taut, ingenious storytelling of series creator Paul T. Scheuring and his staff." Robert Bianco of USA Today commented on the "harebrained absurdities that have swamped this show", and accused the writers of being "incredibly lazy" for the continuous use of the tattoo as an "all-purpose plot fix". Ahsan Haque and Christopher Monfette of IGN credited the creators for not being afraid to take risks, which they felt "paid off for the most part". The reviewers found the biggest success factors to be "the constant swerves and twists" throughout the season, and "the development of the hero-villain relationship between Scofield and Mahone".

The addition of Mahone was well received by critics, who often referred to him as Michael's nemesis. Rob Owen of the Pittsburgh Post-Gazette found Mahone to be "a far more worthy adversary for Michael than prison guard Brad Bellick... who's still after the convicts but seems like a cartoon compared to the Inspector Javert-like Mahone." Brian Zoromski from IGN believes that the "strongest portions of 'Manhunt' deal with the introduction of a new character, an FBI Agent named Alexander Mahone, played by the great character actor William Fichtner." Digital Spy's Ben Rawson-Jones praised the "wonderful" Fichtner, claiming he "quickly became more appealing than the brooding hero himself". Robert Bianco of USA Today said that Fichtner was a welcome addition to the cast, and Andy Dehnart from MSNBC called Mahone the best new character of the second season.

Ratings
The premiere of the season obtained an average of 9.40 million American viewers, a decrease from the 10.50 million viewers who watched the series premiere, and the 10.24 million viewers who watch the first-season finale. The season obtained its largest audience with the episode "Chicago", which averaged 10.12 million viewers; however, the season finale received one of the lowest audiences in the series' history with 8.12 million viewers. The season averaged 9.30 million American viewers for all 22 episodes. Out of all regular primetime programming that aired during the 2005–2006 American television season, Prison Break ranked #51 out of #142, according to the Nielsen ratings system. In Australia, the season premiere was watched by an average of 1.22 million viewers, however ratings dropped consistently throughout the season. In the United Kingdom, ratings declined from an average audience share of 9% in the first season to 8.5% in the second. The season's penultimate episode, "Fin Del Camino", was viewed by an average of 1.20 million viewers, gaining a 7% audience share. As a result of the declining ratings during the season, Five decided not to air the third season and it was picked up by Sky1. Prison Break was simulcast in Canada on Global, where it ranked in the top ten of the highest rated television series.

Awards
The season was nominated for five awards, winning one. Dominic Purcell won the Australian Film Institute International Award for Best Actor. Work on the episode "Disconnect" was nominated for two Motion Picture Sound Editors Golden Reel Awards. Music editor David Klotz was nominated for Best Sound Editing in Music for Television — Short Form. The supervising sound editor, along with four foley artists and four sound effects editors were nominated for Best Sound Editing in Sound Effects and Foley for Television — Short Form. At the 2007 Teen Choice Awards, Wentworth Miller was nominated for Choice TV Actor: Drama, and Robert Knepper was nominated for Choice TV: Villain.

Home media release

References
General
Prison Break: Season 2 at IGN
Prison Break — Season 2 DVD Information at TVShowsOnDVD.com

Specific

External links
 

Prison Break
Prison Break episodes
2006 American television seasons
2007 American television seasons